Uli's Famous Sausage is a butcher shop and sausage vendor founded by German master butcher Uli Lengenberg in Seattle, Washington. It is located in the Pike Place Market.

Description 
Seattle Metropolitan says, "Really fine chorizo, bratwurst, and other German sausages, in the heart of Pike Place Market. Eat in the indoor beer garden or take it away."

Reception 
In Frommer's Seattle (2011), Karl Samson said "sausage lovers should be sure to have at least one sausage sandwich" at Uli's. In 2014 and 2015, the Not for Tourists Guide to Seattle said the business offers Seattle's best sausage. The Seattle Post-Intelligencer included Uli's in lists of "iconic Seattle bites" in 2020 and 2021.

References

External links

 
 

Food and drink companies based in Seattle
German restaurants in Seattle
German-American culture in Washington (state)
Pike Place Market
Restaurants in Seattle
Sausage companies of the United States
Central Waterfront, Seattle